Luis Alberto Avilés Farías (born 2 July 1990) is an Argentine professional footballer who plays as a defender or midfielder for Deportivo Español.

Career
Avilés played for Deportivo Caraza and Unión Progresistas at youth level, prior to joining the academies of Lanús and El Porvenir. He scored once in thirty-eight for El Porvenir in Primera C Metropolitana. Fellow fourth tier team Deportivo Español signed Avilés on 30 June 2012. Ten appearances occurred in his first two seasons, which concluded with promotion to Primera B Metropolitana in 2013–14. He didn't feature in 2014 or 2015, eventually making his bow in tier three during a defeat to Platense on 5 March 2016; replacing Juan Ignacio Semería after sixty-five minutes. He participated in twenty-one fixtures across the following two campaigns.

Career statistics
.

References

External links

1990 births
Living people
Footballers from Buenos Aires
Argentine footballers
Association football defenders
Association football midfielders
Primera C Metropolitana players
Primera B Metropolitana players
El Porvenir footballers
Deportivo Español footballers